Troy Neal is an American former professional American football player who played for the New York Jets of the National Football League. He attended Townsend Park High School, a segregated blacks-only school in Pine Bluff, Arkansas, and the University of Arkansas at Pine Bluff. He played for the Jets in the 1974 preseason before suffering a career-ending knee injury against the Denver Broncos.

References

New York Jets players
University of Arkansas at Pine Bluff alumni
Year of birth missing (living people)
Living people
Sportspeople from Pine Bluff, Arkansas
Players of American football from Arkansas
African-American players of American football
American football running backs